B-Sides, Remixes and Rarities is a compilation album from British dance-rock duo Grand National. The UK-only release collects all of the band's B-sides and two remixes from their Kicking the National Habit album.

Track listing

References

2007 compilation albums
Grand National (band) albums